WCHU-LD (channel 3) is a low-power television station licensed to Oakwood Hills, Illinois, United States, serving the Chicago area and primarily airing paid programming. It is a translator of Sugar Grove-licensed WILC-CD (channel 8) which is owned by Venture Technologies Group; it is also a sister station to WRME-LD (channel 6). WCHU-LD's transmitter is located atop the Trump International Hotel and Tower on Wabash Avenue north of the Chicago Loop.

Subchannels
The station's digital signal is multiplexed:

References

Low-power television stations in the United States
CHU-LD